Group 6 may refer to:

Group 6 element, chemical element classification
Group 6 (racing), FIA classification for sports car racing
Group 6 Rugby League, rugby league competition in New South Wales, Australia